The County Antrim & District Football Association Senior Shield (more commonly known as the County Antrim Shield) is a football competition in Northern Ireland. The competition is open to senior teams who are members of the North East Ulster Football Association (also known as the County Antrim & District Football Association) (membership of which extends geographically beyond County Antrim itself), often plus intermediate teams who qualify via the Steel & Sons Cup, depending on the numbers required. For the 2010–11 and 2011-12 seasons, only the winners took part.

The current Shield champions are Larne, who beat Linfield 4–3 on penalties in the 2022–23 final, winning the trophy for a third successive year.

During the later 1980s and early 1990s, the North East Ulster F.A. invited senior clubs from outside its jurisdiction to participate. Hence the Shield has been won by Newry Town (later Newry City) and Glenavon, neither of which are members of the North East Ulster Football Association.

The Shield has been regularly sponsored since the late 1980s. The 2014–15 competition was sponsored by Toals Bookmakers.

Final results
Key:

Performance by club

Centenary Chalice
To mark the centenary of the County Antrim F.A., a Centenary Chalice was played for in 1987–88. Glentoran won it, defeating Ballymena United 4–2 in the final.

Notes

References

External links
Irish League Archive - County Antrim Shield

Association football in County Antrim
Association football cup competitions in Northern Ireland